The 1930 Cincinnati Bearcats football team was an American football team that represented the University of Cincinnati as a member of the Buckeye Athletic Association during the 1930 college football season. In their fourth and final season under head coach George Babcock, the Bearcats compiled a 5–4 record.

Schedule

References

Cincinnati
Cincinnati Bearcats football seasons
Cincinnati Bearcats football